The Battle of Suvodol was fought near Sjenica between the Serbian rebels under Karađorđe and Ottoman army consisting of Albanians under Köprülüzade Numan Pasha in late May 1809, during the First Serbian uprising. It resulted in a Serbian victory.

Prelude
In the spring of 1809, during the Russo-Turkish War (1806–12), the Serbs took up arms once again, and begun directing attacks on Serb-inhabited territories outwards of the former Sanjak of Smederevo. Prior to the Battle of Suvodol, Karađorđe and his forces liberated Nova Varoš and Sjenica and moved onwards towards the river Lim. On 9 June and wary of Köprülüzade Numan Pasha’s forces that were already based in the Suvi Do area, Karađorđe’s forces moved onwards from the river Lim towards Suvi Do.  The next day on 10 June, Karađorđe’s forces arrived in Suvi Do from the North West. The exact number of soldiers that were deployed is difficult to attain, with some numbers ranging from 8000 to 20000 Albanian fighters under Köprülüzade Numan Pasha's command and between 4000 and 6000 Serbian fighters under Karađorđe’s command. However, a rough estimate puts Karađorđe’s forces at 4–4,500 troops and an unknown number of cannons. While Köprülüzade Numan Pasha's forces were numbered at 4,000 soldiers with no cannons.

Expecting the arrival of revolutionaries, Köprülüzade Numan Pasha's forces began to set up trenches on the hills surrounding Suvi Do. From this vantage point, Albanian forces under Köprülüzade Numan Pasha's command had a view of the plains below and from a strategic point of view; this was a convenient position to be in. However, thanks to the dense forest below and morning fog, Karađorđe’s forces were able to sneak up to the Albanian trenches without being detected.

Battle
The first attack on the trenches was ferocious; Karađorđe’s forces were able to take positions early on, but due to weaknesses of the Serbian forces (fatigue from the previous night's march), Köprülüzade Numan Pasha’s forces had a strong advantage early on in repelling the attack. Köprülüzade Numan Pasha was aware of his initial advantage and tried to capitalize on it. On the evening of 10 June, Numan Pasha ordered a counter-attack on the revolutionaries and forced the Serbian forces back to their cannon lines. However, with defeat in sight, Serbian Cavalry under the command of Vojvoda Vule Ilić Kolarac attacked one of the Albanian wings with such force and surprise that it threw the Albanian forces in disarray as the cavalry were flanking them. Albanian forces attempted to regroup and attack the revolutionaries; however, they were met with fierce gunfire from the Serbian cannons and infantry. In the midst of the fighting and poor visibility due to the fog, Vojvoda Vule Ilic Kolarac began to yell out in Turkish "our forces have retreated" to fool the Albanians into retreating. This ploy threw Köprülüzade Numan Pasha's forces into even more disarray.  Battered by relentless attacks, the injured Köprülüzade Numan Pasha and his forces retreated.

The retreating Albanian forces tried to regroup and ambush revolutionaries who were chasing after them. However, the Albanian forces were pushed further into rocky canyons where the Serbian revolutionaries began to shower the Albanians forces with large boulders that were abundant in the area. Those who survived the onslaught retreated towards Peć and Novi Pazar.

Aftermath
Köprülüzade Numan Pasha’s forces lost more than 600 men while Karađorđe’s forces lost 120 men. The victory of the battle liberated further territory and opened up further routes into Montenegro.

References

Sources

 
 

Suvodol
Suvodol
Suvodol
First Serbian Uprising
1809 in Serbia
Sjenica
May 1809 events